Zathura: A Space Adventure (also known simply as Zathura) is a 2005 American science fiction adventure film directed by Jon Favreau. It is an adaptation of the 2002 children's book Zathura by Chris Van Allsburg, author of the 1981 children's book Jumanji. It is a standalone spin-off of the 1995 film Jumanji and the second installment of the Jumanji franchise. The film stars Josh Hutcherson, Jonah Bobo, Dax Shepard, Kristen Stewart, and Tim Robbins.

The story is about two squabbling brothers, Danny and Walter Budwing (portrayed by Bobo and Hutcherson, respectively) who find a mysterious board game in the basement which transports their house into outer space. Along with their older sister Lisa (Stewart) and an astronaut (Shepard), they try to survive the game so they can return home.

The film was shot in Los Angeles and Culver City, California, and was released on November 11, 2005 in the United States. Unlike Jumanji, which was distributed by TriStar Pictures, the film was distributed by Columbia Pictures, which is co-owned with TriStar through Sony Pictures Entertainment. It received positive reviews from critics and grossed $65.1 million worldwide.

Plot 
Walter and Danny are two brothers who do not get along with each other or with their teenage sister, Lisa. While their divorced father is away at work and Lisa, whom he left in charge, is napping, Danny discovers an old science fiction-themed board game called Zathura in the basement. When he starts playing, the game produces a card that details a meteor shower. After an actual meteor shower occurs in the living room, Walter and Danny realize the game is affecting reality.

The boys discover the house is floating in outer space. Lisa thinks she has overslept because of the dark sky and prepares to go out, however the next card puts her in cryonic sleep, leaving her frozen solid. Walter soon concludes they must win the game to return everything to normal. As they continue to play, Walter and Danny overcome the dangers presented by the game, including the appearance of a defective robot, passing too close to a star, and an attack on the house by a race of reptilian aliens called Zorgons. One of Danny's turns causes an astronaut to appear, who methodically eliminates the house's heat sources, as the Zorgons are attracted to heat.  The astronaut lures the Zorgons' ship away by setting the boys' father's couch on fire and ejecting it from the house.

Walter demands that the astronaut leave, but Danny chooses to let him stay. Growing increasingly agitated, Walter accuses Danny of cheating of moving his piece prematurely; when he tries to move the piece back and takes his next turn, the game reacts as if Walter were cheating and ejects him from the house, but the astronaut rescues him. Danny apologizes to Walter, but he does not forgive. On Walter's next turn, he receives a card that allows him to make a wish, resulting in another heated argument between the boys. The astronaut warns Walter not to make a wish out of anger.

Fearing the worst, the astronaut is relieved to discover that Walter merely wished for an autographed football. He explains his origins, saying that he and his brother had played the game before. He received the wish card, but after an escalating fight, he wished his brother was never born. This resulted in him being stranded, as he was unable to finish the game without the second player. Upon hearing this, Danny and Walter finally put their differences aside.

Lisa awakens from her stasis and, still oblivious to the situation, turns up the heat. The Zorgons return and anchor their ships to the house. Lisa finally discovers the predicament and the quartet hide, only to realize that they left the game behind. Danny finds the game aboard one of the Zorgon ships, but is spotted. Walter uses a "Reprogram" card he drew earlier to fix the robot, who attacks the Zorgons instead, causing them to retreat.

Walter receives another wish card; he uses it to bring the astronaut's brother back into existence. The astronaut reveals he is actually an older version of Walter from an alternate timeline and commends his past self for making a better choice than he did. The astronaut and the alternate Danny merge with their counterparts as the timeline changes.

The Zorgons return to the house with a massive fleet, with the intent of destroying it. When Danny makes the winning move, it is revealed that Zathura is a black hole, which proceeds to consume the Zorgons' fleet and the house. The siblings find themselves back in the house as it was before the brothers started the game, just as their father returns home. Their bond renewed, they promise to each other and Lisa to not tell anyone about the game and their adventure.

Cast 

 Josh Hutcherson as Walter 
 Jonah Bobo as Danny 
 Dax Shepard as Astronaut
 Kristen Stewart as Lisa 
 Tim Robbins as Dad
 Frank Oz as the voice of Robot

Additionally, John Alexander performed as the Robot, Derek Mears as Lead Zorgon, and Douglas Tait, Joe Bucaro, and Jeff Wolfe, portray individual Zorgons.

Production 
Director Jon Favreau acknowledged the influence of other films saying Zathura had some bits like Star Wars, Indiana Jones, Battle Beyond the Stars, and Superman. Favreau was aware of Dax Shepard from the TV series Punk'd but was convinced to cast him because Mike Judge put him in Idiocracy and because of his background in improvisation with The Groundlings that Will Ferrell had also come out of.

Favreau preferred to use practical effects instead of computer generated imagery (CGI) in the film. He said, "it's so fun to actually shoot real spaceships or have a real robot running around on the set, or real Zorgons built by Stan Winston. It gives the actors, especially young actors, so much to work off of". Dax Shepard, who plays the astronaut, said he would not have been interested in doing the film if the effects had been CGI-based. Actress Kristen Stewart enjoyed the on-set effects, saying, "When we harpooned walls and ripped them out, we were really doing it. When there was a fire on set, there was really fire," and that "[t]he only green screen I was ever involved with was for getting sucked out into the black hole." The exteriors for the house were filmed at Oaklawn Avenue, South Pasadena.

Miniature models were used to create the spaceships; Favreau enjoyed using techniques used in many earlier films, such as the Star Wars trilogy. in some shots the Zorgon ships were computer-generated, and in many of the scenes digital effects were used to create, for example, meteors and planets, and limbs for the robot suit built by Stan Winston Studios. CGI was used to augment the Zorgon suits, which were constructed so that the head came out of the front of the suit where the actor's chest was and the actor wore a blue screen hood over his own head, and to create an entirely computer-generated Zorgon for one scene. A full life size frozen model of Kristen Stewart was made by Stan Winston Studios. She described the process of modeling and being scanned to make it as arduous; it included details down to the freckles on her arm. She called the result an incredible experience, comparing it to having a twin. Real goats were used and extra eyes were later added using CGI. According to visual effects supervisor Pete Travers, from Sony Pictures Imageworks, it "was a very important aspect of the effects" to retain the stylized "1950s sci-fi look" from Van Allsburg's book, and was inspired by the pointillist style in painting.

Favreau says the most complicated shot in the film was when the house was caught in the gravity field of Tsouris-3. All the cast and crew had to be safely secured with cables and harnesses. Favreau called it "an overwhelming experience".

Release 
Favreau discouraged the notion that the film is a sequel to the 1995 film Jumanji, having not particularly liked the film. Both he and author Chris Van Allsburg—who also wrote the book upon which Jumanji is based—stated Zathura is very different from Jumanji. The film was marketed by the studio as taking place within the same fictional universe, and series actor Jack Black considers it the second installment of the Jumanji franchise.<ref>{{cite tweet |user=Fandom |url=https://twitter.com/getfandom/status/1099802291278757889|number=1099802291278757889|date=February 24, 2019 |title=Jack Black says the next Jumanji film is actually the 4th in the series – 'You forgot about the one in space ... 'Zathura 🚀👾 |via=Twitter }}</ref> Author Chris Van Allsburg attributed the lack of box office success to marketing and timing.

The studio marketed the release of the film in an attempt to generate word of mouth with tie-ins, including an episode of The Apprentice. Favreau appeared as a guest judge, and the show's two teams were assigned the task of designing and building a float to publicize the film.
Favreau attended Comic Con for the first time to promote the film.

The film was released on VHS and DVD in 2006, and a Bluray 10th Anniversary edition was released in 2015.

 Box office 
With its $65 million budget, Zathura: A Space Adventure was considered a flop, grossing $13,427,872 in its opening weekend, while the holdover Disney animated film, Chicken Little earned more than twice as much that weekend. The film lost 62% of its audience the following weekend, in part due to the opening of Harry Potter and the Goblet of Fire. Zathura ended its theatrical run with a gross of $29,258,869. The international box office total was $35,820,235, bringing its total worldwide gross to $65,079,104.

 Critical response 

On Rotten Tomatoes, the film has an approval rating of 76% based on 161 reviews, and an average rating of 6.54/10. The website's critical consensus reads, "Dazzling special effects for the kids + well-crafted storytelling for the [parents] = cinematic satisfaction for the whole family." On Metacritic, the film has a weighted average score of 67 out of 100, based on reviews from 30 critics, indicating "generally favorable reviews". Audiences polled by CinemaScore gave the film an average grade of "B+" on an A+ to F scale.

Roger Ebert of the Chicago Sun-Times gave it 3 out of 4 stars, praised Favreau, and wrote: "Zathura lacks the undercurrents of archetypal menace and genuine emotion [...] but it works gloriously as space opera." 
Justin Chang of Variety said it was "arguably the best adaptation of a Chris Van Allsburg book to date" and praised "Favreau's amiably low-key sense of humor and assured handling of well-trod emotional territory." John DeFore of The Hollywood Reporter called it a "rare beast -- a family film that even childless adults can enjoy", and praised the performances both from child actors and from Dax Shepard. Stephen Holden of The New York Times said Zathura richly gratifies the fantasy of children; "not just to play a board game, but to project themselves into its world". Desson Thomson of The Washington Post wrote that Zathura has "an appealing, childlike sense of wonder".

The connection to Jumanji may have been a disadvantage, with critics such as Luke Baumgarten for the Inlander referring to it as "Jumanji in space without Robin Williams".

 Accolades 

Zathura was nominated for two Saturn Awards, for Best Fantasy Film, and Josh Hutcherson for Best Performance by a Younger Actor.

At the Hollywood Film Awards Avy Kaufman won the award for Casting Director of the Year, for her work on Capote, Brokeback Mountain, Get Rich or Die Tryin', Syriana, and Zathura.
At Young Artist Awards Josh Hutcherson won in the category "Best Performance in a Feature Film (Comedy or Drama)" by a Leading Young Actor, and Jonah Bobo was nominated in the category "Best Performance in a Feature Film" by a Young Actor Age Ten or Younger.

 Legacy 

In a 2018 review for Den of Geek, Tim George called it "a terrific movie worthy of reappraisal" praising the witty, efficient script, sense of directorial whimsy, and focus on character over special effects.

Favreau said the film wasn't released so much as it "escaped". He further described the experience: "After the highs of the success of Elf, Zathura was sobering and, though it was well-received by the critics and I learned a tremendous amount about visual effects, the grim reality of the movie business hit me like a bucket of cold water."

Jack Black expressed interest in the possibility of the franchise returning to space. Hiram Garcia, a producer of the Jumanji sequels, said the game contained multiple universes and that the Bazaar introduced in the 2017 film was added to be a central hub for a larger game universe that the core characters would not know about, and that it could even go into space.

 Books 

The film is based on the illustrated children's book Zathura by Chris Van Allsburg and to tie-in with the film several other books were released including a novelization Zathura: The Movie – Junior Novel as well as several other activity and play books.

 Board game 
A board game that sought to mimic the film's eponymous game was released by Pressman Toy Corporation. Titled Zathura: Adventure is Waiting'', the game incorporated a spring-driven, clockwork card delivery mechanism, an astronaut, the Zorgons, the haywire robot and the disintegrating house in various ways.

Video game 
A video-game tie-in was released on November 3, 2005, developed by High Voltage Software and published by 2K Games for PlayStation 2 and Xbox. The games received "generally unfavorable reviews".

References

External links

 
 
 

2005 films
2000s children's adventure films
2000s children's fantasy films
2005 science fiction films
Alternate timeline films
American fantasy adventure films
American science fantasy films
American space adventure films
Columbia Pictures films
2000s English-language films
Films about board games
Films about extraterrestrial life
Films about siblings
Film spin-offs
Films based on children's books
Films based on works by Chris Van Allsburg
Films directed by Jon Favreau
Films produced by Michael De Luca
Films scored by John Debney
Films with screenplays by David Koepp
Jumanji
Rings of Saturn in fiction
2000s fantasy adventure films
Films produced by Scott Kroopf
2000s American films